Francis T. Roots Building, also known as the Roots Building, is a historic commercial building located at Muncie, Delaware County, Indiana. It was built in 1895, and is a three-story, square plan, Queen Anne style brick building.  The building features marble and limestone panels, projecting bays, and a corner turret. The building was remodeled about 1940 and restored in the 1980s.

It was added to the National Register of Historic Places in 1984.

References

Commercial buildings on the National Register of Historic Places in Indiana
Queen Anne architecture in Indiana
Commercial buildings completed in 1895
Buildings and structures in Muncie, Indiana
National Register of Historic Places in Muncie, Indiana